Prithviraj Chouhan may refer to

 Prithviraj Chauhan, the ruler of the kingdom of Ajmer and Delhi in northern India during the latter half of the 12th century
Prithviraj Raso, medieval Indian epic about the king by Chand Bardai
Prithviraja Vijaya, Indian poem in Sanskrit about the king
Prithviraj Chauhan, Nepali-language epic about the Indian king by Laxmi Prasad Devkota
Prithviraj Chouhan (1924), 1924 Indian silent film
Prithviraj Sanyogita (1929), 1929 Indian silent film by Narayanrao D. Sarpotdar
Prithviraj (1931), 1931 Indian silent film by R. N. Vaidya
Prithviraj Sanyogita (1933) 1933 Indian Hindi-language film 
Prithviraj Samyogita (1946), 1946 Indian Hindi-language film by Najam Naqvi
Samrat Prithviraj Chauhan (1959), 1959 Indian Hindi-language film by Harsukh Jagneshwar Bhatt
 Samrat Prithviraj, 2022 Indian film on Prithviraj Chauhan
 Dharti Ka Veer Yodha Prithviraj Chauhan, Indian TV show aired on Star Plus in 2006-09
 Veer Yodha Prithviraj Chauhan (2008), 2008 Indian animated film
 Prithviraj Chauhan, Indian Amar Chitra Katha comic title
 Prithviraj Chavan, an Indian politician and former Chief Minister of Maharashtra State, India

See also
Prithviraj (disambiguation)
Chahamanas (disambiguation), alternate rendition of Chauhan
Pithora (disambiguation), alternate rendition of Prithviraj